The Americas Zone was one of three zones of regional competition in the 2016 Fed Cup.

Group I 
 Venue: Country Club Las Palmas, Santa Cruz, Bolivia (outdoor clay)
 Date: 3–6 February

The eight teams were divided into two pools of four teams. The two pool winners took part in a play-off to determine the nation advancing to the World Group II play-offs. The four nations finishing third and fourth in their pools took part in relegation play-offs, with the two losing nations being relegated to Group II for 2017.

Pools

Play-offs

Final placements 

  was promoted to the 2016 Fed Cup World Group II play-offs.

Group II 
 Venue: Centro de Tenis Honda, Bayamón, Puerto Rico (outdoor hard)
 Date: 1–6 February

The nine teams were divided into one pool of four teams and one pool of five teams. The top two nations in each pool took part in play-offs, with the two winning nations being promoted to Group I for 2017.

Pools

Play-offs

Final placements 

References 

 Fed Cup Result, 2016 Americas Group I
 Fed Cup Result, 2016 Americas Group II

External links 
 Fed Cup website

 
Americas
Tennis tournaments in Bolivia
Tennis tournaments in Puerto Rico